Tin Liu Tsuen is a walled village in Shap Pat Heung, Yuen Long District, Hong Kong.

Administration
Tin Liu Tsuen is a recognized village under the New Territories Small House Policy.

History
The village was historically a Punti village, settled by four clans surnamed Wu, Wong, Yip and Sit. In the early 19th century, the village was part of the Shap Pat Heung (literally 'Eighteen Villages Alliance').

At the time of the 1911 census, the population of Tin Liu was 105. The number of males was 48.

Features
The main shrine of Tin Liu Tsuen is dedicated to Tai Wong, the protective deity of the village. Rebuilt in 1935, it lies on the central axis of the village together with the Entrance Gate. The entrance gate was rebuilt in 1930. Both the Entrance gate and the main shrine are listed as Grade III historic buildings.

Education
Tin Liu Tsuen is divided between Primary One Admission (POA) School Net 73 and POA School Net 74. Within POA 73 are multiple aided schools (operated independently but funded with government money) and one government school: South Yuen Long Government Primary School (南元朗官立小學). POA 74 has multiple aided schools and one government school: Yuen Long Government Primary School (元朗官立小學).

See also
 Walled villages of Hong Kong
 Sham Chung Tsuen, a village adjacent to Sham Chung Tsuen, to its east

References

External links

 Delineation of area of existing village Tin Liu (Shap Pat Heung) for election of resident representative (2019 to 2022)
 Antiquities Advisory Board. Pictures of Entrance Gate, No. 7 Tin Liu Tsuen
 Antiquities Advisory Board. Pictures of Main Shrine, No. 73 Tin Liu Tsuen

Walled villages of Hong Kong
Shap Pat Heung
Villages in Yuen Long District, Hong Kong